Věra Suková (née Pužejová) (13 June 1931 – 13 May 1982) was a tennis player from Czechoslovakia. She was the women's singles runner-up at Wimbledon in 1962, losing to Karen Hantze Susman 6–4, 6–4.

Suková was a women's singles semifinalist at the French Championships in 1957 and 1963. She teamed with Jiří Javorský to win the mixed doubles title at that tournament in 1957. They were the runners-up in 1961. According to Lance Tingay, Suková was ranked in the world top ten in 1957, 1962, and 1963, reaching a career high of World No. 5 in those rankings in 1962.

Suková was the Czechoslovak national women's singles champion 11 times between 1952 and 1964. After retirement from tennis, Suková served as the coach of Czechoslovakia's national women's team. Under her guidance, the team won the Fed Cup in 1975.

Personal life
Her husband Cyril Suk II, whom she married in 1961, was president of the Czechoslovak Tennis Federation. Their two children, Helena Suková (born 1965) and Cyril Suk III (born 1967), both became successful professional tennis players. Věra Suková died from brain cancer in 1982.

Grand Slam finals

Singles: 1 (1 runner–up)

Mixed doubles: 2 (1 title, 1 runner-up)

Grand Slam singles tournament timeline

See also 
 Performance timelines for all female tennis players who reached at least one Grand Slam final

References

External links
 Official website
 
 
 

Czech female tennis players
Czechoslovak female tennis players
French Championships (tennis) champions
People from Uherské Hradiště
1931 births
1982 deaths
Grand Slam (tennis) champions in mixed doubles
Deaths from brain tumor
Sportspeople from the Zlín Region